Ugo Tognazzi (23 March 1922 – 27 October 1990) was an Italian actor, director, and screenwriter.

Early life
Tognazzi was born in Cremona, in northern Italy but spent his youth in various localities as his father was a travelling clerk for an insurance company.

After his return to his native city in 1936, he worked in a cured meats production plant where he achieved the position of accountant. During World War II, he was inducted into the Army and returned home after the Armistice of 8 September 1943, and joined the Brigate Nere for a while. His passion for theater and acting dates from his early years, and also during the conflict he organized shows for his fellow soldiers. In 1945, he moved to Milan, where he was enrolled in the theatrical company led by Wanda Osiris. A few years later, he formed his own successful musical revue company.

Career
In 1950, Tognazzi made his cinematic debut in I cadetti di Guascogna directed by Mario Mattoli. The following year, he met Raimondo Vianello, with whom he formed a successful comedy duo for the new-born RAI TV (1954–1960). Their shows, sometimes containing satirical material, were among the first to be censored on Italian television.

After the successful role in The Fascist (Il Federale) (1961), directed by Luciano Salce, Tognazzi became one of the most renowned characters of the so-called Commedia all'Italiana (Italian comedy style). He worked with all the main directors of Italian cinema, including Mario Monicelli (Amici miei), Marco Ferreri (La grande abbuffata), Carlo Lizzani (La vita agra), Dino Risi, Pier Paolo Pasolini (Pigsty), Ettore Scola, Alberto Lattuada, Nanni Loy, Pupi Avati and others. Tognazzi also directed some of his films, including the 1967 film Il fischio al naso. The film was entered into the 17th Berlin International Film Festival.

He was a well-known actor in Italy, and starred in several important international films, which brought him fame in other parts of the world.

Roger Vadim cast Tognazzi as Mark Hand, the Catchman, in Barbarella (1968).  He rescues Barbarella (Jane Fonda) from the biting dolls she encounters, and after her rescue, he requests payment by asking her to make love with him (the "old-fashioned" way, not the psycho-cardiopathic way of their future).

In 1981, he won the Best Male Actor Award at the Cannes Film Festival for Tragedy of a Ridiculous Man, directed by Bernardo Bertolucci.  While he worked primarily in Italian cinema, Tognazzi is perhaps best remembered for his role as Renato Baldi, the gay owner of a St. Tropez nightclub, in the 1978 French comedy La Cage aux Folles which became the highest grossing foreign film ever released in the U.S.

Personal life
Ugo Tognazzi died of a brain hemorrhage in Rome in 1990, although there were rumors that his chronic depression led to suicide. He is buried in the cemetery of Velletri.

His sons Ricky Tognazzi (b. 1955) and Gianmarco Tognazzi (b. 1967) are actors. Another son, Thomas Robsahm (b. 1964), is a Norwegian film director and film producer. His daughter, Maria Sole Tognazzi (b. 1971), is also a film director.

Filmography

Actor

 The Cadets of Gascony (1950) as Ugo Bossi
La paura fa 90 (1951) as Anastasio Lapin / Saverio Bompignac
Una bruna indiavolata (1951) as Carlo Soldi
Auguri e figli maschi (1951) as Mario
 The Enchanting Enemy (1953) as Direttore della fabbrica
Love in the City (1953) as Himself (segment "Italiani si voltano, Gli")
Sua altezza ha detto: no! (1953) as Ronchi
Siamo tutti milanesi (1953) as Filippo
If You Won a Hundred Million (1953) as Ugo (segment "Il principale")
Café Chantant (1953) as Se stesso / Himself
Assi alla ribalta (1954) as Himself
  Laugh! Laugh! Laugh! (1954) as Dottore
 Milanese in Naples (1954) as Franco Baraldi
La moglie è uguale per tutti (1955) as Ugo
Domenica è sempre domenica (1958) as Ugo
Toto in the Moon (1958) as Achille Paoloni
Mia nonna poliziotto (1958) as Lucio
Marinai, donne e guai (1958) as Domenico Campana
Il terribile Teodoro (1958)
Guardatele ma non toccatele (1959) as Maresciallo Valentino La Notte
Fantasmi e ladri (1959) as Gaetano
Non perdiamo la testa (1959) as Tony Cuccar
Policarpo, "ufficiale di scrittura" (1959) as The Starched Professor (uncredited)
Le cameriere (1959) as Mario, il Ladro
Le Confident de ces dames (1959) as Cesar
Noi siamo due evasi (1959) as Bernardo Cesarotti
La duchessa di Santa Lucia (1959) as L'avvocato
La cambiale (1959) as Alfredo Balzarini
La pica sul Pacifico (1959) as Roberto De Nobel
Tipi da spiaggia (1959) as Pasubio Giovinezza
La sceriffa (1959) as Colorado Joe
I baccanali di Tiberio (1960) as Primo, the Driver
Genitori in blue jeans (1960) as Renzino
Il principe fusto (1960) as Frate
Il mio amico Jekyll (1960) as Professor Fabius / Giacinto Floria
Le olimpiadi dei mariti (1960) as Ugo Bitetti
Femmine di lusso (1960) as Ugo Lemeni
Un dollaro di fifa (1960) as Alamo
Tu che ne dici? (1960) as Solitario
A noi piace freddo (1960) as Ugo Bevilacqua
Gli incensurati (1961) as Farinon
Sua Eccellenza si fermò a mangiare (1961) as Ernesto
Che gioia vivere! (1961) as 1. Anarchist
The Fascist (1961) as Primo Arcovazzi
Cinque marines per cento ragazze (1961) as Sergente Imparato
La ragazza di mille mesi (1961) as Maurizio d'Alteni
Il mantenuto (1961) as Stefano Garbelli (uncredited)
I magnifici tre (1961) as Domingo
Pugni pupe e marinai (1961) as Capo Campana / Tognazzi
Una domenica d'estate (1962)
La voglia matta (1962) as Antonio Berlinghieri
Psycosissimo (1962) as Ugo Bertolazzi
A Girl... and a Million (1962) as Un automobilista (uncredited)
I tromboni di fra' Diavolo (1962) as Sergente Visicato
I motorizzati (1962) as Achille Pestani
March on Rome (1962) as Umberto Gavazza
La donna degli altri è sempre più bella (1963) as Himself (segment "La luna di miele")
The Shortest Day (1963) as Pecoraio
RoGoPaG (1963) as Togni (segment "Il pollo ruspante")
Le ore dell'amore (1963) as Gianni
The Conjugal Bed (1963) as Alfonso
I mostri (1963) as The Father (segment "L'Educazione sentimentale") / Policeman (segment "Il Mostro") / Stefano (segment "Come un Padre") / Battacchi (segment "Il povero Soldato") / L'Onorevole (segment "La Giornata dell'Onorevole") / Latin Lover (segment "Latin Lovers-Amanti latini") / Pilade Fioravanti (segment "Testimone volontario") / The Traffic Warden (segment "L'Agguato") / The Car Owner (segment "Vernissage") / The Man at Cinema (segment "Scenda l'Oblio") / The Husband (segment "L'Oppio dei Popoli") / Guarnacci (segment "La nobile Arte")
I fuorilegge del matrimonio (1963) as Vasco Timballo
Le motorizzate (1963)
La donna degli altri è sempre più bella (1963) as Himself (segment "La luna di miele")
Alta infedeltà (1964) as Cesare (segment "Gente Moderna")
Liolà (1964) as Liolà 
La Donna scimmia (1964) as Antonio Focaccia
La vita agra (1964) as Luciano Bianchi
Il magnifico cornuto (1964) as Andrea Artusi
Controsesso (1964) as The professor (segment "Professore, Il")
Una moglie americana (1965) as Riccardo Vanzi
I Complessi (1965) as Prof. Gildo Beozi (segment "Il Complesso della Schiava nubiana")
Io la conoscevo bene (1965) as Gigi Baggini
Oggi, domani, dopodomani (1965) as Man With Car (segment "L'uomo dei 5 palloni") (uncredited)
Menage all'italiana (1965) as Carlo Vignola Federico Valdesi
Break-up (1965) as Man With Car
Follie d'estate (1966)
Silly Toons (1966) as Simple Simon
Marcia nuziale (1966) as Frank
A Question of Honour (1966) as Efisio Mulas
I nostri mariti (1966) as Appuntato Umberto Codegato (segment "Il Marito di Attilia")
Le piacevoli notti (1966) as Uguccione de' Tornaquinci
The Seventh Floor (1967) as Giuseppe Inzerna
L'immorale (1967) as Sergio Masini
Il padre di famiglia (1967) as Remo
Gli altri, gli altri... e noi (1967) 
L'harem (1967) as Himself (uncredited)
Straziami, ma di baci saziami (1968) as Umberto Ciceri
Barbarella (1968) as Mark Hand
Sissignore (1968) as Oscar Pettini
La bambolona (1968) as Giulio Broggini
Satyricon (1969) as Trimalchione
Porcile (1969) as Herdhitze
Il Commissario Pepe (1969) as Commissario Antonio Pepe
Nell'anno del Signore... (1969) as Cardinal Agostino Rivarola
Cuori solitari (1970) as Stefano
Venga a prendere il caffè... da noi (1970) as Emerenziano Paronzini
Splendori e miserie di Madame Royale (1970) as Alessio / Madame Royale
La califfa (1970) as Annibale Doberdò - il proprietario della fabbrica
La supertestimone (1971) as Marino Bottecchia detto 'Mocassino'
In nome del popolo italiano (1971) as Mariano Bonifazi
Stanza 17-17, palazzo delle tasse, ufficio imposte (1971) as Ugo La Strizza
Questa specie d'amore (1972) as Federico / Federico's father
L'udienza (1972) as Aureliano Diaz
Il maestro e Margherita (1972) as Nikolaj Afanasijevic Maksudov 'Maestro'
Il generale dorme in piedi (1972) as Col. Umberto Leone
Vogliamo i colonnelli (1973) as Onorevole Giuseppe 'Beppe' Tritoni
La grande abbuffata (1973) as Ugo
Property Is No Longer a Theft (1973) as The Butcher
Don't Touch the White Woman! (1974) as Mitch
Claretta and Ben (1974) as Gino Pistone
Permettete signora che ami vostra figlia? (1974) as Gino Pistone
Romanzo popolare (1974) as Giulio Basletti
La mazurka del barone, della santa e del fico fiorone (1975) as Baron Anteo Pellacani
La smagliatura (1975) as Georgis
Amici miei (1975) as Lello Mascetti
L'anatra all'arancia (1975) as Livio Stefani
Al piacere di rivederla (1976) as Mario Aldara
Telefoni bianchi (1976) as Adelmo
Cattivi pensieri (1976) as Mario Marani
Signore e signori, buonanotte (1976) as General in Toilet
La stanza del vescovo (1977) as Temistocle Mario Orimbelli
Casotto (1977) as Alfredo Cerquetti
Il gatto (1977) as Amedeo Pecoraro
I nuovi mostri (1977) as Il marito (segment "L'uccellino della Val Padana") / Il cuoco (segment "Hostaria") / Il figlio (segment "Mammina mammona")
Nenè (1977) as 'Baffo' - the barber (uncredited)
La mazzetta (1978) as Il commissario Assenza
Primo amore (1978) as Ugo
La Cage aux Folles (1978) as Renato Baldi
Dove vai in vacanza? (1978) as Enrico (segment "Sarò tutta per te")
L'ingorgo - Una storia impossibile (1979) as Professor
I viaggiatori della sera (1979) as Orso Banti
Sono fotogenico (1980) as Himself (uncredited)
La terrazza (1980) as Amedeo
Arrivano i bersaglieri (1980) as Don Prospero
Sunday Lovers (1980) as Armando (segment "Armando's Notebook")
La Cage aux Folles II (1980) as Renato Baldi
Tragedy of a Ridiculous Man (1981) as Primo Spaggiari
Scusa se è poco (1982) as Carlo Reani
Amici miei atto II (1982) as Conte Raffaello Mascetti
The Key (1983) as Un ubriaco (cameo)
Scherzo del destino in agguato dietro l'angolo come un brigante da strada (1983) as On. Vincenzo De Andreiis
Il petòmane (1983) as Joseph Pujol 
Dagobert (1984) as La pape Honorius et son sosie
Bertoldo, Bertoldino e Cacasenno (1984) as Bertoldo
Fatto su misura (1984) as Dottor Nathan
La Cage aux folles 3 - 'Elles' se marient (1985) as Renato Baldi
Amici miei atto III (1985) as Lello Mascetti
Ultimo minuto (1987) as Walter Ferroni
Arrivederci e grazie (1988) as Carlo
I giorni del commissario Ambrosio (1988) as Giulio Ambrosio
Tolérance (1989) as Marmant
La batalla de los Tres Reyes (1990) as Carlo di Palma

Director
Il mantenuto (1961)
Il fischio al naso (1967)
Sissignore (1968)
Cattivi pensieri (1976)
I viaggiatori della sera (1979)

References

External links

1922 births
1990 deaths
Mass media people from Cremona
Italian male film actors
Italian male stage actors
Italian male television actors
Italian male radio actors
Italian film directors
Italian male screenwriters
Cannes Film Festival Award for Best Actor winners
David di Donatello winners
Nastro d'Argento winners
20th-century Italian male actors
20th-century Italian screenwriters
Italian military personnel of World War II
20th-century Italian male writers